Karizan-e Sofla (also Romanized as Karīzān-e Soflá; also known as Kalāteh-ye Garīzān, Kalāteh Kārīzān, Kalāteh-ye Kārīzān, Kalāteh-ye Kerīzān, and Kārīzān) is a village in Shaskuh Rural District, Central District, Zirkuh County, South Khorasan Province, Iran. At the 2006 census, its population was 339, in 70 families.

References 

Populated places in Zirkuh County